Waterloo Memorial may refer to:

 Waterloo Memorial, or Wellington's Column, in Liverpool, England
 Waterloo Memorial Arena, in Waterloo, Ontario, Canada 
 Waterloo Memorial Recreation Complex, in Waterloo, Ontario, Canada

See also
List of monuments to Arthur Wellesley, 1st Duke of Wellington
Waterloo-Tor, in Osnabrück, Germany
Waterloo Monument, near Ancrum in the Scottish Borders